Llanfwrog may refer to:

Llanfwrog, Anglesey
Llanfwrog, Denbighshire